Ulla Knudsen  (born 21 June 1976) is a Danish footballer who played as a defender for the Denmark women's national football team. She was part of the team at the UEFA Women's Euro 2001 and 1999 FIFA Women's World Cup.

References

External links
 
 

1976 births
Living people
Danish women's footballers
Denmark women's international footballers
Place of birth missing (living people)
1999 FIFA Women's World Cup players
Women's association football defenders